Final Destination is the debut studio album by Japanese rock band Coldrain. Recorded at Studio Sonorous Audio in Tokyo, Japan which was self produced by Masato Hayakawa and Ryo Yokochi, it was released on October 28, 2009 by VAP.

Final Destination was exclusively released in Japan, along with the second studio album follow-up The Enemy Inside, which was released in 2011. Final Destination debuted and peaked at number 88 on the Oricon Albums Chart, before dropping out of the charts completely the following week.

The album housed three singles, two of which were released as maxi-singles. "Fiction" in November 2008 and "8AM" in April 2009 respectively. The final single, "Final Destination", was released 5 days prior to the album's release.

Musical style
Final Destination has been stylistically described as post-hardcore, punk rock and alternative rock.

Track listing

Personnel
Credits retrieved from the album's liner notes.

Coldrain
  – lead vocals, lyricist, producer
  – lead guitar, programming, keyboards, producer, composer
  – rhythm guitar, backing vocals
  – bass guitar, backing vocals
  – drums, percussion

Additional Personnel
 Koichi Hara – recording engineer, mixing
 Hokuto Fukami – assistant engineer
 Hiromichi Takiguchi – mastering (Parasight Mastering, Tokyo)

Charts

Release history

References

External links

2009 debut albums
Coldrain albums
Punk rock albums by Japanese artists
Albums produced by Masato Hayakawa